Dayessi Luis Ruiz (born 23 October 1996) is a Cuban female volleyball player. She is part of the Cuba women's national volleyball team. She participated at the 2014 FIVB Volleball World Grand Prix, 2015 FIVB Volleyball Women's World Cup, and 2017 FIVB Volleyball Women's U23 World Championship.

On club level she played for Camaguey in 2015.

Clubs 
  Camagüey (2014)

References

External links 
http://www.fivb.org/EN/volleyball/competitions/WorldGrandPrix/2014/Players.asp?Tourn=WGP2014b&Team=CUB&No=143341
http://www.norceca.net/USA%E2%80%99s%20Rhamat%20Alhassan%20the%20MVP%20at%20Women%E2%80%99s%20U-20%20NORCECA.htm

1996 births
Living people
Cuban women's volleyball players
Place of birth missing (living people)
Liberos